William Donald Carmichael, Jr. Arena  (formerly known as Carmichael Auditorium and commonly known as Blue Heaven) is a multi-purpose arena on the campus of the University of North Carolina at Chapel Hill in Chapel Hill, North Carolina, United States. It is home to four Tar Heels athletic teams: women's basketball, volleyball, women's gymnastics, and wrestling. It is named for William Donald Carmichael, Jr., a popular former school vice-president and brother of All-America basketball player Cartwright Carmichael.

Although there had been concerns as early as the late 1940s that the men's basketball team's needed a new home to replace 6,000-seat Woollen Gymnasium, the need for a larger arena had become acute by the 1960s with the team's growing popularity. The Tar Heels were forced to move home games to Charlotte or Greensboro, which were more than double Woollen's size.

However, the state was unwilling to fund a completely new arena. As a result, Carmichael Auditorium was built as an annex to Woollen; it shares the older facility's eastern wall. It originally seated just over 8,800 people, but was expanded to 10,000 seats in 1976.

Carmichael was known as one of the loudest arenas in the country while the Tar Heel men played there, largely because of a low roof and a student section that ringed the court. In part due to this formidable home court advantage, the men had a record of 169–20 (.894) in just over 20 seasons there. Dean Smith was the Tar Heels' coach for their entire tenure in Carmichael. The Tar Heels won their second NCAA title in 1981–82, while playing at the arena.

In their last game at Carmichael, the North Carolina Tar Heels beat the North Carolina State Wolfpack 90–79 on January 4, 1986. The team moved to the Dean Smith Center two weeks later. After a remodeling project completed in 2009, capacity is 8,010.

A new floor was installed in 1998, after a roof fire that occurred in February during renovations.  The arena was completely remodeled beginning in spring 2008, and the women's team joined the men in the Dean Smith Center until completion in December 2009.  The facility was officially renamed Carmichael Arena during the women's team's matchup against rival Duke on February 28, 2010.

The men's team played their first round home game of the 2010 National Invitation Tournament at Carmichael because renovations were taking place at the Smith Center.  On March 16, 2010, they defeated William & Mary in their first official game at Carmichael in 24 years. Coincidentally, William & Mary was the first-ever opponent for the men's basketball team in Carmichael Arena in 1965. In December 2019, due to a scheduling conflict with the university's fall commencement, the Carolina men's basketball team played their first regular season game in Carmichael since moving to the Smith Center full-time in 1986 against the Wofford Terriers, losing 68–64.

The arena hosted a speech by President Barack Obama on April 24, 2012.

History

By 1948, there began to be sentiments that Woollen was too small. In 1958, after the university began to reduce the number of true home games, the student newspaper The Daily Tar Heel showed dissatisfaction with that decision and felt a new gym with a larger capacity would be needed to keep drawing strong competition. The article cited how  Coach Adolph Rupp and the Kentucky Wildcats played at Duke in front of a less than capacity crowd and would not return because they made little money off the visit. In July 1962, there was a request to the North Carolina state legislature by the Consolidated University to receive funds to build an addition to Woollen Gym rather than a new $6 million coliseum as some had proposed.

Construction began in May 1964 for the new annexed Auditorium. On August 16, 1965, a water main that was connected improperly broke and flooded the auditorium with eight inches of water, which delayed the consutrction until a new floor could be placed. It was hoped that the larger capacity (then estimated to be 10,000) in the auditorium would allow the university to turn a profit on home games for basketball. With the 10,000 projected seats, it would have been the sixth largest "building of its type" in North Carolina. Two-thirds of the seats will be arm-chairs, while the remainder were bleachers that can be retracted with hydraulics. At the time, the basketball program only made money from road trips. By September 1965, it was estimated the total cost of the facility was $1.725 million, with the opening of the new facility university accountant Vernan Crook hoped to turn a profit of $1,000 to $2,000 per home game. Athletic Director C.P. Erickson stated that the new building would not be large enough to fit the growing student body and that the school would need to start planning on how to expand the venue further to accommodate the growth. At that time, the air conditioning ducts had been installed but the school lacked the funds for installing the cooling equipment. The new venue that shared Woollen's eastern wall was finished in 1965 in time for the start of the 1965–66 season, where they defeated the William & Mary Indians 82–68.

As the Tar Heels increased in popularity, the university chose to have home games at off–campus venues as Woollen's seating was so limited, choosing to play in Charlotte or Greensboro instead. By playing at these locations, the school would turn more profit than normal home games at Woollen since student tickets were limited for these games and the venue was larger, allowing more tickets to be sold to the masses. In the team's final season at Woollen, the Tar Heels only played seven true home games. Due the various factors including Woollen Gymnasium's capacity, basketball practices being interrupted by intramural sports, and limited office space, the University of North Carolina administration sought plans to build a new facility. The venue was to be named for William Donald Carmichael Jr. a former school vice president and former varsity basketball player from 1917 to 1920, as well as brother of Cartwright Carmichael. The Woollen's seating capacity the amount of home games the school could host to around seven games a season, it was hoped that the opening of Carmichael Auditorium would allow for ten home games a season. The new Auditorium's facilities would contain offices for all athletic departments, except for football which would be housed in the then Kenan Fieldhouse, in the east endzone of Kenan Memorial Stadium. A trophy hall will be located in the entrance hallway and housed the trophies of all the athletic programs.

The venue was known for its loud atmosphere and temperature, so much that Maryland Terrapins coach Lefty Driesell and Virginia Cavaliers coach Terry Holland accused Dean Smith of tampering with the thermostat. Smith would often keep Carmichael warm during practice to simulate the stuffy game conditions. Long time assistant coach and future head coach Roy Williams once said "I guarantee you that for $1,000, Coach Smith couldn’t have found the thermostat or the light switch in Carmichael Auditorium."

Issues with limited seating capacity forced the university to consider a new facility starting in the 1970s. However, at the time a large fundraising effort for the school was ongoing and efforts would be started following its conclusion in 1979.

Carolina played their final home game at Carmichael on January 4, 1986 against NC State Wolfpack and won 90–79. Since the team's departure for the Smith Center, the men's basketball has returned to Carmichael on two occasions in 2010 and 2019, where they played William & Mary as a part of the National Invitation Tournament and won 82–70 and later against Wofford, losing 68–64. In total, Carolina played 191 games in Carmichael and finished with a record of 170–21 (.890). As of the conclusion of the 2021–22 season, Carmichael has the best home winning percentage of the five home venues for the Tar Heels. The Tar Heels went undefeated at Carmichael Auditorium in six of their twenty-one seasons at the facility: 1969–69 (9–0), 1970–71 (9–0), 1971–72 (9–0), 1978–79 (9–0), 1983–84 (9–0), and 1977–78 (10–0). The most losses in a single season while playing in Carmichael came in the 1972–73 campaign when the Tar Heels lost three games. The Tar Heels showed success in the Atlantic Coast Conference, winning the ACC regular season title in 1967, 1968, 1969, 1971, 1972, 1976, 1977, 1978, 1979, 1982, 1983, 1984, and 1985, while winning the post–season conference tournament in 1967, 1968, 1969, 1972, 1975, 1977, 1979, 1981, and 1982.

See also
 List of NCAA Division I basketball arenas

References

Citations

Bibliography

External links
Carmichael Arena page on University of North Carolina Athletics website

College basketball venues in the United States
College gymnastics venues in the United States
College wrestling venues in the United States
College volleyball venues in the United States
North Carolina Tar Heels basketball venues
Basketball venues in North Carolina
Sports venues completed in 1965
1965 establishments in North Carolina